Oliver Enwonwu is a Nigerian artist, curator, art administrator, writer, and publisher. He is the founder of Omenka Gallery, and the son of Ben Enwonwu (1917–1994), a renowned Nigerian painter and sculptor. Oliver is the former National President of Society of Nigeria Artists (SNA), the professional body of visual artists in Nigeria.

Education 
Oliver had his secondary school at King's College, Lagos. He obtained his first university degree in Biochemistry from the University of Lagos. He holds Master's degrees applied geophysics, and visual arts from the same university.

Career 
Oliver learnt the fundamentals of drawing and painting from his father, Ben Enwonwu. He however opted to study Biochemistry in the university, being that he had learnt the fundamentals from his father, he perceived that visual art would not be as challenging as his desired course of study.

He was the national president of the Society of Nigerian Artists as its president from 2009 to July 2021.

References

Living people
Year of birth missing (living people)